Sant'Angelo Lodigiano (locally ) is a comune (municipality) in the Province of Lodi in the Italian region Lombardy, located about  southeast of Milan and about  southwest of Lodi.

People
Saint Francesca Cabrini (1850–1917), Catholic teacher and missionary
Mario Beccaria (1920-2003), mayor from 1960 to 1964 and politician of the Democrazia Cristiana, member of the Italian Chamber of Deputies from 1968 to 1976
Danilo Gallinari (born 1988), NBA player
Alessandro Matri (born 1984), football player

References

External links
 Official website

Cities and towns in Lombardy